Huntington is a civil parish in Cheshire West and Chester, England. It contains nine buildings that are recorded in the National Heritage List for England as designated listed buildings, all of which are at Grade II. This grade is the lowest of the three gradings given to listed buildings and is applied to "buildings of national importance and special interest". The parish is entirely rural, and all the listed buildings are domestic or related to farming.

See also
 Listed buildings in Aldford
 Listed buildings in Chester
 Listed buildings in Christleton
 Listed buildings in Eaton
 Listed buildings in Eccleston
 Listed buildings in Great Boughton
 Listed buildings in Rowton
 Listed buildings in Saighton

References

Listed buildings in Cheshire West and Chester
Lists of listed buildings in Cheshire